The Legislature of Entre Ríos is the local legislature of the Argentinian province of Entre Ríos. It is a bicameral body, comprising the Chamber of Deputies of Entre Ríos (34 members), and the Senate of Entre Ríos (17 members). It is one of eight bicameral legislatures in the country.

It is elected by a general provincial first-past-the-post voting (Senate), mixed bonus system and proportional representation for the Chamber, and renewed every 2 years by electing a new half of each house. Each representative serves a four-year term. The Provincial Constitution denotes its legislative powers.

The Legislature meets in the provincial capital.

See also

 List of provincial legislatures in Argentina
 Parliament of Argentina

References

Bicameral legislatures
Government of Argentina
Entre Ríos Province
Entre Ríos